Cashel (also known as Cashel Borough) was a constituency represented in the Irish House of Commons until its abolition on 1 January 1801. It returned two members to the Parliament of Ireland to 1800.

Borough
This constituency was the parliamentary borough of Cashel, County Tipperary.

History
In the Patriot Parliament of 1689 summoned by James II, Cashel was represented with two members. Following the Act of Union 1800 the borough retained one parliamentary seat in the United Kingdom House of Commons.

Members of Parliament
 1585 Denis Conway and Patrick Kearney
 1613–1615 John Sale and Dr John Haley
 1634–1635 Thomas Little and Dr John Haley
 1639–1649 Thomas Little (died and replaced 1640 by Richard Haley (recorder)) and Patrick Boyton
 1661–1666 Richard Le Hunte and Eliah Greene

1689–1801

Notes

References

Bibliography

Constituencies of the Parliament of Ireland (pre-1801)
Historic constituencies in County Tipperary
Cashel, County Tipperary
1800 disestablishments in Ireland
Constituencies disestablished in 1800